Wyebank is a settlement located 27 km north-west of Durban, KwaZulu-Natal, South Africa and forms part of the eThekwini Metropolitan Municipality which is the greater Durban metropolitan area. It is surrounded by Ngqungqulu in the north, KwaDabeka in the east, New Germany in the south and Kloof in the west.

Wyebank has a large population number, but not much a big location in the metropolitan area.

International disc jockey DJ Lag attended the local high school Wyebank Secondary School.

References

Suburbs of Durban